Murray Glacier is a valley glacier,  long, draining seaward along the east side of Geikie Ridge in the Admiralty Mountains. Its terminus coalesces with that of Dugdale Glacier where both glaciers discharge into Robertson Bay along the north coast of Victoria Land. First charted by the British Antarctic Expedition 1898-1900, under Carsten Borchgrevink, who named this feature for Sir John Murray of the Challenger Expedition, 1872–76.

References

Glaciers of Pennell Coast